The Heart of America Athletic Conference (HAAC or The Heart) is a college athletic conference affiliated with the National Association of Intercollegiate Athletics (NAIA). Member institutions are located in Iowa, Kansas, Missouri, and Nebraska in the United States.

History

The HAAC's earliest ancestor was the Missouri College Athletic Union (MCAU), which was formed in 1924 when the Missouri Intercollegiate Athletic Association (now the Mid-America Intercollegiate Athletics Association or MIAA) split in two. The old MIAA's private schools formed the Athletic Union, while the state teachers' colleges stayed in the MIAA. It was reorganized as the HAAC in 1971 when it began admitting schools outside Missouri. However, the HAAC does not presently claim the Athletic Union's history as its own.

In early 2014, Grand View University and William Penn University were announced as members for the 2015–16 school year.  In April 2015, Clarke University and Mount Mercy University were also announced as members for the 2016–17 school year. In October 2019, Park University was approved for HAAC membership and joined in the 2020–21 school year. On February 10, 2022, long-serving Evangel University accepted its invitation to join the Kansas Collegiate Athletic Conference, also Kansas-based, in 2023–24.

The current commissioner of the conference is Lori Thomas. Thomas, the first female commissioner in NAIA history, began her term in 2014, succeeding Larry Lady who retired after 22 years as commissioner.

Chronological timeline
 1971 - The Heart of America Athletic Conference (HAAC) was founded. Charter members included Baker University, Central Methodist College (now Central Methodist University), the College of Emporia, Graceland College (now Graceland University), Missouri Valley College, Ottawa University, Tarkio College and William Jewell College beginning the 1971-72 academic year.
 1974 - The College of Emporia left the HAAC as the school announced that it would close after the 1973-74 academic year.
 1980 - Culver–Stockton College and Mid-America Nazarene College (now MidAmerica Nazarene University) joined the HAAC in the 1980-81 academic year.
 1982 - Ottawa left the HAAC to re-join the Kansas Collegiate Athletic Conference (KCAC) after the 1981-82 academic year.
 1986 - Central Methodist left the HAAC to become an NAIA Independent after the 1985-86 academic year.
 1987 - Evangel College (now Evangel University) joined the HAAC in the 1987-88 academic year.
 1991 - Benedictine College joined the HAAC (with Central Methodist re-joining), both effective in the 1991-92 academic year.
 1996 - Lindenwood College (now Lindenwood University) joined the HAAC in the 1996-97 academic year.
 2000 - Avila College (now Avila University) joined the HAAC in the 2000-01 academic year.
 2011 - Two institutions left the HAAC and the NAIA to join the Division II ranks of the National Collegiate Athletic Association (NCAA): Lindenwood as an NCAA D-II Independent (which would later join the Mid-America Intercollegiate Athletics Association (MIAA) in the 2012-13 academic year), and William Jewell to the Great Lakes Valley Conference (GLVC), both effective after the 2010-11 academic year.
 2011 - Peru State College joined the HAAC in the 2011-12 academic year.
 2015 - Grand View University and William Penn University (both coming from the defunct Midwest Collegiate Conference (MCC)) joined the HAAC in the 2015-16 academic year.
 2016 - Clarke University and Mount Mercy University (also both coming from the defunct Midwest Collegiate (MCC) after spending a season as NAIA Independents) joined the HAAC in the 2016-17 academic year.
 2017 - Dickinson State University joined the HAAC as an affiliate member for men's wrestling, effective in the 2017-18 academic year.
 2018 - Avila left the HAAC to join the KCAC after the 2017-18 academic year.
 2020 - Park University joined the HAAC in the 2020-21 academic year.
 2020 - Three institutions joined the HAAC as affiliate members: Missouri Baptist University and the University of Health Sciences and Pharmacy in St. Louis (UHSP) for men's volleyball, and Waldorf University for men's & women's wrestling, all effective in the 2020-21 academic year.
 2021 - Two institutions joined the HAAC as affiliate members: St. Ambrose University for only men's wrestling, and Iowa Wesleyan University for men's & women's wrestling, both effective in the 2021-22 academic year.
 2022 - Evangel announced that it will leave the HAAC after it has accepted to join the KCAC beginning the 2023-24 academic year.

Member schools

Current members
The HAAC currently has 14 full members, all but one are private schools:

Notes

Affiliate members
The HAAC currently has six affiliate members, all but one are private schools:

Notes

Former members
The HAAC had six former full members, all were private schools:

Notes

Membership timeline

Sports
The conference also sponsors co-ed varsity sports of dance and cheer.

See also
Heart of America (college rugby)
Football seasons: 2011, 2012

References

External links